Sandungueo, also known as Perreo, is a style of dance and party music associated with reggaeton that emerged in the late 1980s in Puerto Rico. This style of dancing and music was created by DJ Blass, hence his Sandunguero Vol. 1 & 2 albums and popularized and spread worldwide by the website Sandungueo.com.

It is a dance that focuses on moving the hips. It can be danced in many ways. Men and women dance it differently. Perreo, like most dances can be danced alone by moving the hips or it can also be danced with a partner. Bad Bunny made a song called "Yo Perreo Sola," a song for women to emphasize that perreo can also be danced alone and not necessarily with a partner. This goes back to Ivy Queen, who empowered the reggaeton culture by putting in her songs a message for women that they're the ones that can take the lead and remind them that respect is important in perreo.

Origins 
Sandungueo, or perreo is a dance that involves front-to-back pelvic thrusts in swiveling movements of the hips and pelvis, mirroring movements of sexual intercourse, specifically, anal sex or "doggy-style". The general attitude of the dance is seduction, with most of the dance is made up of the female grinding her backside into the male's crotch. Alongside the sexual insinuations within the movement, there are several natural improvisations and role reversals.

Drawing on research conducted in Cuba by ethnomusicologist Vincenzo Perna (see his book "Timba, the sound of the Cuban crisis", Ashgate 2005), author Jan Fairley suggested that this style of dance, along with other timba moves such as despelote, tembleque, and subasta de la cintura, in which the woman is both in control and the main focus of the dance, can be traced to the economic status of Cuba in the 1990s and to the choreographic forms of popular music dancing of that period, particularly in relation to Afro-Cuban timba. As the US Dollar (which functioned as a dual currency alongside the Cuban Peso until 2001) became more valuable, women changed their style of dance to be more visually appealing to men; in particular, to yumas ("foreigners"), who had dollars. This tension between use of the female body as both an objectified commodity and an active, self-created persuasive tool is one of the many paradoxes dembow dancing creates in Cuba.

Further, Cubans attribute this women-led style of dancing as originating from the Caribbean, where the waistline movements of whining are quite similar to Sandungueo. Sandungueo has both originated from and influenced several other styles of hip-oriented sexual dancing, including American twerking, grinding, and bootydancing. Sandungueo also borrows gestures from other Latin American dance styles such as salsa and merengue.

Dance Movements 
Typical gestures of Sandungueo consist of pelvic thrusting, mimicking anal sex, where the female is typically bent over, with her backside swiveling the male's crotch. These gestures mirror other dance styles such as twerking or grinding, but there are unwritten rules of appearance that make Sandungueo distinct. For example, usually the female's hips sway more vigorously into the loose male's, and the female's knees are flexed downwards and upwards, similar to salsa and merengue.

The sexual dynamic in the movements creates a character for each dancer to fulfill, specifically a role for the designated male, the "penetrator" and the female, the "penetrated". However, the concept of dominance within traditional social dance, which is typically assigned to male roles, is subjugated in Sandungueo. The female dancer is considered to be in control of the partnered dance, while maintaining the "penetrated" role. Often, the female uses this level of control to lead the male into doing what she likes. Additionally, the female dancer is known to terminate the dance by walking away if she disapproves of the male's behavior, insinuating that the female's role of control and dominance is to be respected.

Controversy 
Sandungueo.com and the Underground/Reggaeton music genre were the subject of a national controversy in Puerto Rico as reggaeton music and the predominantly lower class culture it derived from became more popular and widely available. Velda González, a well known senator and public figure in Puerto Rico and Dominican Republic, led a campaign against reggaeton and specifically attacked Sandungueo.com and the perreo style of dancing, which she marked as overtly erotic, sexually explicit, and degrading to women.

Sandungueo has also been much criticized in Cuba. Part of the criticism may be due to its association with reggaeton, which, while very popular in Cuba, has also been heavily criticized for being degrading to women. Perreo has been seen as a departure from classical front-to-front dancing (salsa etc.) to back-to-front dancing. Some Cuban dancers argue that this puts women in control. Others have argued that it is un-Cuban, and the Cuban government seemed to agree when it banned reggaeton (which was sometimes referred to as Cubaton) in Cuba in 2012.

A remix called "Perreo intenso" was one of the popular songs during the Telegramgate protests that led to the Puerto Rican governor, Ricardo Rosselló's renouncing his position.

An analysis of Puerto Rico's discourse shows politicians and reggaeton artists denouncing each other's corruption and immoral behavior, respectively.

Doble Paso 
Doble Paso is a form of Sandungueo or Perreo in which the rhythm and the tempo of the songs is faster, resulting in a dance form which is more sexually explicit and intense. Doble Paso is mainly emerging and gaining popularity among Puerto Rican teens; thus causing parents and the conservative community to criticize this form of dance.

See also 
 Reggaeton
 Twerking
 Daggering
Yo Perreo Sola

References 

Afro-Caribbean culture
Afro–Puerto Rican
Latin dances
Reggaeton